Pedro Shimose Kawamura (born 30 March 1940) is a poet, journalist, professor and essayist from Bolivia. He has been based in Madrid, Spain since 1971. Shimose is considered one of Bolivia's most notable poets.

Biography 
Shimose was born in 1940 to Japanese-Bolivian parents in the town of Riberalta in the lowland Beni department. He studied at the Higher University of San Andrés in La Paz, Bolivia, and graduated from the Complutense University of Madrid in Spain. 

He specialized in journalism and worked for some time on the newspaper Presencia. He also taught at the Higher University of San Andrés.

In 1972, he was awarded the Casa de las Américas Prize for the poetry collection Quiero escribir, pero me sale espuma ("I want to write, but all that comes out is bubbly froth"). In 1999, he received the Premio Nacional de Cultura de Bolivia. He is a member of the Academia Boliviana de la Lengua and of the Spanish Association of Art Critics.

Shimose is best known for his politically inspired poetry which touches on the themes of national identity and social liberation.

Bibliography 
Since Triludio en el exilio ("Triludio in exile") was first released in 1961, eight further poetry collections by Shimose have been published: Sardonia ("Isle of Snark"), Poemas para un pueblo ("Poems for a people"), Caducidad del fuego ("Fire's expiration date"), Al pie de la letra ("Letter of the law"), Reflexiones maquiavélicas ("Machiavellian reflections"), Bolero de caballería ("Calvary jacket"), Riberalta, and Poemas ("Poems"). Other publications include a book of short stories, El Coco se llama Drilo ("The boogeyman's name is Drilo"), and a Diccionario de autores iberoamericanos ("Dictionary of Latin American authors").

Works 
 Triludio en el exilio (1961)
 Sardonia (1967)
 Poemas para un pueblo (1968)
 Quiero escribir, pero me sale espuma(1972)
 Caducidad del fuego (1975)
 Al pie de la letra (1976)
 El Coco se llama Drilo (stories, 1976)
 Reflexiones maquiavélicas (1980)
 Diccionario de Autores Iberoamericanos (1982)
 Bolero de caballería (1985)
 Poemas (1988; collects poetry from his previous books)
 Historia de la literatura hispanoamericana (1989)
 Riberalta y otros poemas (1996)
 No te lo vas a creer (2000)

Awards 
Casa de las Américas Prize in 1972
Premio Nacional de Cultura de Bolivia in 1999

References

External links 
Bolivia web

1940 births
Living people
People from Vaca Díez Province
Bolivian people of Japanese descent
Bolivian male writers
Bolivian expatriates in Spain
Complutense University of Madrid alumni
Bolivian poets